NFL Sports Talk Football '93 is an American football video game featuring Joe Montana, released in 1992. It is the third in the series, and the first to be licensed by the National Football League.

Overview
 Being officially licensed by both the NFL and NFLPA allows this game to use all the real NFL team names, and the trademarked phrase "Super Bowl", where previously teams only represented cities, and played for the 'Sega Bowl'; all of the league's (then) 28 teams, in addition to all of the league's players and their attributes from the 1992 season are featured.
 Joe Montana is the only player whose name is spoken; the following year's NFL Football '94 Starring Joe Montana game also featured Troy Aikman, perhaps due to his leading the Dallas Cowboys to Super Bowl success in 1993 (and 1994).
 Players may choose to play an exhibition game, or compete in the league (16 games, then the playoffs and Super Bowl).

Features
Running commentary using 'Sports Talk 2.0' technology, which was highly regarded at the time, having around 500 different phrases uttered by Lon Simmons
A 'playbook' containing 50 possible plays
Four possible views of the field:
Horizontal. (on the sidelines)
From the blimp. (above field)
Behind the defense.
Behind the offense.
Camera zooms in when a player crosses the line of scrimmage, or the ball is thrown by the quarterback
Choice of:
20-, 40- or 60-minute-long (full-length) games. Either way, they are divided into four quarters that are either 5, 10, or 15 minutes long.
Fair, rainy or snowy weather
Natural turf, artificial turf or domed stadium
League play could be saved, and continued later by entering a ten-character code.

External links
The Joe Montana series (part of The History of Football Games, page 14)
NFL Sports Talk Football '93 at GameFAQs

1992 video games
Joe Montana video games
NFL Sports Talk Football video games
Sega video games
Sega Genesis games
Sega Genesis-only games
Video games developed in the United States
Video games set in 1992
Multiplayer and single-player video games